Andrew Sawyers is an American college baseball coach and former catcher. Sawyers is the head coach of the Southeast Missouri State Redhawks baseball team.

Playing career
Sawyers attended Willits High School in Willits, California. Sawyers played for the school's varsity baseball team. Sawyers then enrolled at the Point Loma Nazarene University, to play college baseball for the Point Loma Nazarene Sea Lions baseball team.

As a freshman at Point Loma Nazarene University in 1994, Sawyers didn't appear in a single game.

After taking a year off, Sawyers returned to baseball at Mendocino College.

In the 1997 season as a junior, Sawyers transferred to play baseball for Nebraska and hit .268, hit 5 home runs, slugged .395 and had 38 RBIs.

As a senior in 1998, Sawyers had a .163 batting average, a .258 on OBP and appeared in 22 games.

Coaching career
Sawyers earned his first ever head coaching job at Hutchinson Community College.

Sawyers served as an assistant at Texas A&M during the 2008 season while earning his master's degree.

On June 27, 2008, Sawyers was named an assistant coach for the Kansas State Wildcats baseball.

On July 29, 2016, Sawyers was named the head coach at Southeast Missouri State University.

Head coaching record

See also
 List of current NCAA Division I baseball coaches

References

External links
Southeast Missouri State Redhawks bio

Living people
1975 births
Baseball catchers
Point Loma Nazarene Sea Lions baseball players
Mendocino Eagles baseball players
Nebraska Cornhuskers baseball players
Northwestern State Demons baseball coaches
Nebraska Cornhuskers baseball coaches
Hutchinson Blue Dragons baseball coaches
Texas A&M Aggies baseball coaches
Kansas State Wildcats baseball coaches
Southeast Missouri State Redhawks baseball coaches
People from Willits, California
Baseball coaches from California